Ana Huanca Coaquira (born 20 October 1986) is a Bolivian footballer who plays as a forward for the Bolivia women's national team.

Early life
Huanca hails from the Cochabamba Department.

International career
Huanca played for Bolivia at senior level in three Copa América Femenina editions (2010, 2014 and 2018) and the 2014 South American Games.

References

1986 births
Living people
Women's association football forwards
Women's association football midfielders
Bolivian women's footballers
People from Cochabamba Department
Bolivia women's international footballers
Competitors at the 2014 South American Games